Ernest Sykes VC (4 April 1885 – 3 August 1949) was an English recipient of the Victoria Cross, the highest and most prestigious award for gallantry in the face of the enemy that can be awarded to British and Commonwealth forces.

VC action
Sykes was 32 years old, and a private in the 27th (Service) Battalion (4th Tyneside Irish), Northumberland Fusiliers, British Army during the First World War when the following deed took place on Easter Monday, 9 April 1917  near Arras, France, for which he was awarded the VC. His battalion in attack was held up by intense fire from front and flank, and suffered heavy casualties. Private Sykes, despite this heavy fire, went forward and brought back four wounded. He then made a fifth journey and remained out under conditions which appeared to be certain death, until he had bandaged all those too badly injured to be moved.

His VC citation reads: 

During the Second World War Sykes returned to serve with the 25th Battalion West Riding Home Guard.

His Victoria Cross is displayed at the Fusiliers Museum of Northumberland, Alnwick, Northumberland, England.

Commemoration
In 1920 the London and North Western Railway named Claughton-class locomotive No. 2035 'Private E. Sykes, V.C.' in his honour. This locomotive was rebuilt in 1933 as a 4-6-0 class 6P5F Patriot class with the LMS number 45537, retaining the name Private E. Sykes, V.C. until withdrawn from service and scrapped in 1962. The brass nameplate from the locomotive is on display at the Northumberland Fusiliers' Museum at Alnwick Castle in Northumberland.

Sykes is honoured by a Tameside Metropolitan Borough Council blue plaque erected in 1996 at the George Lawton Hall in his home town of Mossley, Greater Manchester. A second plaque was erected in 2004 at his workplace of Mossley railway station.

References

 David Harvey, Monuments to Courage (1999)
 The Register of the Victoria Cross (This England, 1997)
 Graham Ross, Scotland's Forgotten Valour (1995)

External links
Location of grave and VC medal (West Yorkshire)
Manchester Heroes

Further reading
 Tyneside Irish, 24th, 25th, 26th & 27th (Service) Battalions of Northumberland Fusiliers, pp. 211, 212
 Miniature Matters, Rigour in Research, Journal (2013)
 R. Colbourne, Ernest Sykes, VC: a short biography (2006)
 UK Government, Integration & Community Rights Directorate, 22/05/2014
 Interview, Manchester Evening News, 13 July 1917

1885 births
1949 deaths
People from Mossley
Royal Northumberland Fusiliers soldiers
British Army personnel of World War I
British World War I recipients of the Victoria Cross
British Home Guard soldiers
Duke of Wellington's Regiment soldiers
British Army recipients of the Victoria Cross
Military personnel from Manchester